The Embarras River is a  tributary of the Wabash River in southeastern Illinois in the United States. The waters of the Embarras reach the Gulf of Mexico via the Wabash, Ohio, and Mississippi Rivers. The name comes from French explorers, who used the term embarras for river obstacles, blockages, and difficulties relating to logjams and the like.

Course

The Embarras River rises in Champaign County. The upper reaches of the Embarras include the detention ponds near the intersection of Windsor Road with U.S. Route 45 in southeastern Champaign; the southern portion of the University of Illinois campus, including the small creek near the Vet Med Building; and Meadowbrook Park in south Urbana.

The Embarras flows generally southward through Douglas, Coles, Cumberland, and Jasper Counties. In Jasper County, it turns southeast for the remainder of its course through Richland, Crawford, and Lawrence Counties. In Coles County, a dam helps create Lake Charleston. Portions of the river's lower course have been straightened and channelized.

Along its course, the Embarras passes the towns of Villa Grove, Camargo, Charleston, Greenup, Newton, Ste. Marie, and Lawrenceville.

Tributaries
 In its upper course in Champaign County, the river collects the East Branch Embarras River, which rises in southwestern Vermilion County and flows  generally westwardly in a channelized course, past the town of Broadlands. 
 In Coles County, the Embarras collects the Little Embarras River, which rises in Edgar County and flows  southwestwardly. 

Variant names
The United States Board on Geographic Names settled on "Embarras River" as the stream's official name in 1964. According to the Geographic Names Information System, it has also been known as the "Ambraw River" and as the "Embarrass River."

Ecology
The only population of harlequin darters (Etheostoma histrio) in Illinois is found in the Embarras River.

History
In the 18th century, the Embarras River was part of the trail from Cahokia to Vincennes. The river route was used by George Rogers Clark's forces during the Illinois Campaign.

See also
List of Illinois rivers
Watersheds of Illinois

References

Columbia Gazetteer of North America entry
DeLorme (2003). Illinois Atlas & Gazetteer. Yarmouth, Maine: DeLorme. .

External links
Embarras River - Illinois Geographic Alliance
Surf the Embarras with USEPA
Prairie Rivers Network

Rivers of Illinois
Tributaries of the Wabash River
Rivers of Champaign County, Illinois
Rivers of Douglas County, Illinois
Rivers of Coles County, Illinois
Rivers of Cumberland County, Illinois
Rivers of Jasper County, Illinois
Rivers of Richland County, Illinois
Rivers of Crawford County, Illinois
Rivers of Lawrence County, Illinois